Chunhua Subdistrict is one of the 13 subdistricts of Hedong District, Tianjin. it borders Wangchuanchang Subdistrict in the north, Changzhou Road Subdistrict in the east, Tangjiakou and Dawangzhuang Subdistricts in the south, and Guangfudao Subdistrict in the west. It had 69,829 people under its administration as of 2010.

The name Chunhua can be literally translated as "Spring Magnificence".

History 
In 1996, the region was divided into 4 subdistricts: Hepingcun, Ligonglou, Shenzhuangzi and Guozhuangzi.

Administrative divisions 
As of the time in writing, the following 14 communities constituted Chunhua Subdistrict:

Gallery

References 

Township-level divisions of Tianjin
Hedong District, Tianjin